Silgerd (also Romanized as Sīlgerd and Sīlgord; also known as Mīlgerd and Selgerd) is a village in Shoja Rural District, in the Central District of Jolfa County, East Azerbaijan Province, Iran. At the 2006 census, its population was 345, in 102 families.

References 

Populated places in Jolfa County